Tenezara is a village in Sidi Bel Abbès Province in north-western Algeria.

References

Populated places in Sidi Bel Abbès Province